Mohsen Makhmalbaf (Mohsen Makhmalbaaf; born May 29, 1957) is an Iranian film director, writer, film editor, and producer. He has made over 20 feature films, won 50 awards, and been a juror in more than 15 major film festivals. His award-winning films include Kandahar; his latest documentary is The Gardener and latest feature The President.

Makhmalbaf's films have been widely presented at international film festivals in the past ten years. The director belongs to the new wave movement of Iranian cinema. Time selected Makhmalbaf's 2001 film Kandahar as one of the top 100 films of all time. In 2006, he was a member of the Jury at the Venice Film Festival.

Makhmalbaf left Iran in 2005 shortly after the election of Mahmoud Ahmadinejad, and has lived in Paris since the events of the 2009 Iranian presidential election.

Life 

Makhmalbaf was born in Tehran on May 29, 1957. At the age of 15, he became involved in a militant group fighting against the rule of Mohammad Reza Pahlavi, the then Shah of Iran, and at the age of 17, he was imprisoned for stabbing a policeman and sentenced to death. After serving five years of his sentence, he was released in the wake of the Iranian Revolution. He left Iran in 2005.

Career
Makhmalbaf is a major figure in Iranian cinema. His films have explored the relationship between the individual and a larger social and political environment. As a result, his work serves as an extended commentary on the historical progression of the Iranian state and its people. Makhmalbaf has worked in several genres, from realist films to fantasy and surrealism, minimalism, and large frescoes of everyday life, with a preference (common to Iranian directors) for the themes of childhood and cinema.

In 1981, he wrote the screenplay for Towjeeh, directed by Manuchehr Haghaniparast. In 1982, he wrote the screenplay for Marg Deegari, directed by Mohammad-Reza Honarmand. He made his first film, Tobeh Nosuh, in 1983, and Boycott, a film set in pre-revolutionary Iran, in 1985. The latter tells the story of Valeh (Majid Majidi), a young man sentenced to death for Communist tendencies, and is widely believed to be based on Makhmalbaf's own experiences.

Makhmalbaf portrays human despair, exploitation, and resilience in The Cyclist (1987), a movie about Nasim, a poor Afghan refugee in Iran in desperate need of money for his ailing wife. Nasim agrees to ride a bicycle in a small circle for one week for the money he needs to pay his wife's medical bills.

In 1989, Iranian director Abbas Kiarostami read in the newspaper about an incident in which a Tehranian man named Hossain Sabzian tricked a family into believing he was Makhmalbaf. Kiarostami adapted the case into the 1990 docufiction film Close-Up, and recruited Makhmalbaf himself to appear in the final scene of the film. Close Up is now regarded as a masterpiece of world cinema and was voted by critics onto 2012's Sight and Sound list of The Top 50 Greatest Films of All Time.

Time of Love (1991) is Makhmalbaf's ninth feature film and the first film of what he calls his "third period". It is a romantic trilogy that offers three variations of the same story.

Makhmalbaf directed Gabbeh in 1996. The film follows the nomadic Ghashghai people, whose bright, bold carpets tell stories. The main thread features a young woman who loves a mysterious stranger but is forbidden to marry him. The film is romantic and non-realistic, with events seeming to leap around in time and space, much like a dream.

Makhmalbaf took time off from directing in 1996 to form the Makhmalbaf Film House, a school for young filmmakers. It quickly became a private production house for the increasing number of filmmakers in his family. In 1997, his 17-year-old daughter Samira directed The Apple, using him as a scriptwriter and editor. Makhmalbaf's wife, Marziyeh Meshkini, worked as an assistant director to her daughter and then took up directing herself.

Kandahar (2001) is a fictional odyssey inspired by a true story set in Afghanistan before the September 11 attacks, as the Taliban's laws strip women of civil rights and hope and a Western-cultured Afghan woman returns to prevent her sister's suicide during the last eclipse of the 20th century.

Early years of revolution

In contrast to his later career, for about a decade after the revolution, Makhmalbaf's views and films served as the voice of revolutionary art in the cultural atmosphere of Iran. Moreover, some pre-revolutionary filmmakers have accounts of celebrities hurt by Makhmalbaf's positions in this period. Saeed Motalebi, an established writer and director before the revolution, is one of the people who has repeatedly recounted stories about how Makhmalbaf's stances affected pre-revolutionary stars. One of these accounts refers to the 1982 film The Imperilled (Barzakhi-ha) written by Motalebi and had four pre-revolutionary male stars in the lead roles. It was directed by Iraj Ghaderi and, with its patriotic story about resisting foreign invasion, it was a chance for Fardin, Malek-Motiei, Ghaderi and Rad to renew their threatened careers as actors in the post-revolutionary atmosphere. The film was a hit and became the highest-grossing Iranian film of all time in its short period of theater screening. But it was soon banned and consequently the four actors were banned from working. About how the film's success was turned into disaster Motalebi says: In one Friday Mr. Mohsen Makhmalbaf gathered a couple of people and they started collecting signatures for a petition which was written on a scroll, stating that "We have made a revolution while these actors are transgressors." They did it right in front of that theater in the Revolution Square near the university of Tehran. They said "Look how theaters are crowded while friday events are deserted." That's how they stopped my film.
Then a reporter who was queued to ask something about our film, went and told the then prime minister (Mir-Hossein Mousavi) "There is a film in theaters whose writer wants to convey that people who are fighting in the fronts are problematic persons." The prime minister replied, "These are leftovers of junk intellectuals who will soon go to the dustbin of history." Malek-Motiei became jobless and turned his garage into a pastry shop. Ghaderi put some rice bags in his office and became a rice dealer. Fardin opened a pastry shop too and when I visited him, I used to wait outside as long as there were no customers so that he wouldn't feel ashamed when he saw me. These were all caused by those illogical efforts, which I will never forgive.

There is also a letter by Makhmalbaf dating back to 1986 in which he attacks filmmakers like Dariush Mehrjui and Ali Hatami. Addressing Mohammad Beheshti Shirazi, then head of Farabi Cinema Foundation, which was Iran's main governmental film production company, Makhmalbaf says: "Two hours ago when I saw The Lodgers I was ready to attach a grenade to myself and hold Mehrjui to take both of us to the other world."

In later years, Makhmalbaf became deeply disillusioned, first by the Islamic regime and soon after by Islamic ideology. By the early 1990s, he was one of the most outspoken critics of the government in Iran. Although Amir-Hossein Fardi, writer and Makhmalbaf's former colleague, has stated that Makhmalbaf hasn't changed and his inalterable characteristic has been extremist attitude, then pro-revolution, and now anti-revolution.

Degrees and honors

Mohsen Makhmalbaf: Selected as the best filmmaker after the revolution by readers of cinema publications, 1988
A Moment of Innocence: Among Top Ten Films of the Decade – Awarded by International Festival Directors and Critics 1999
"Federico Fellini Honor" from UNESCO in Paris, 2001 (France)
"Freedom to Create Prize" for his human rights activity and promoting social justice through his art, Art Action, England, 2009
Honorary Degree of Doctor of Cinema from Nanterre University, France, 2010
Honorary Degree of Doctor of Literature from St Andrews University, Scotland, 2011

Filmography

Films banned in Iran

 The Nights of Zayande-rood (1990), banned since 1990
 Time of Love (1991), banned since 1991
 Once Upon a Time, Cinema (1992), banned from 1992 until 1993
 A Moment of Innocence (1996), banned from 1996 until 1997
 The Silence (1998), banned from 1998 until 2000
 The Gardener (2012), banned since 2012

Film appearances
 Marriage of the Blessed (1989), directed by himself
 Close-Up (1990), directed by Abbas Kiarostami
 Hello Cinema (1995), directed by himself
 A Moment of Innocence (1996), directed by himself
 Tales of an Island (2000), directed by himself and Dariush Mehrjui

See also
 Cinema of Iran

Further reading
Hamid Dabashi, Close Up: Iranian Cinema, Past, Present, and Future. (Chapter on Makhmalbaf). Verso, 2001.
Hamid Dabashi, Like Light from the Heart of Darkness. Sakuhinsha, Japan, 2004.
 Hamid Dabashi, Masters & Masterpieces of Iranian Cinema: (Chapter XI: Mohsen Makhmalbaf: A Moment of Innocence. pp. 325–368). Mage Publishers, 2007. .
Hamid Dabashi, Makhmalbaf at Large: The Making of a Rebel Filmmaker. I. B. Tauris, 2007.
 The Peddler: (Director’s interview, Screenplay, Reviews, and Study) Compiled by Ebrahim Nabavi, 1989.
 Salam Cinema: (Screenplay, Interviews, Reviews, and Study) Compiled by Amir Khosravi, 1996.
 Gabbeh: (Photographs with along Screenplay) Photography by: Mohammad Ahmadi, 1996.
 Silence: (Photographs with along Screenplay) Photography by: Maysam Makhmalbaf, 1998.
 Mohsen Makhmalbaf: (Review and Study) Compiled by: Alberto Barbara (in Italian), 1996.
 Makhmalbaf’s Broken Mirrors: (Review and Study) Compiled by: Lyrid Dijeon (in English), 2000.
 Introducing of Mohsen Makhmalbaf and his works: (Review and Study) Compiled by: Baharlou, 1995 (second print: 1998).
 "Salaam Cinema, Films of Makhmalbaf Family" by Pusan International Film Festival, 2000. 
 "The Films Of Makhmalbaf (Cinema, Politics & culture In Iran)" by: Eric Egan, 2005.
 " Makhmalbaf at Large" (Review and Study) by: Hamid Dabashi, 2008.
 "Mohsen Makhmalbaf: From Discourse to Dialogue" (Review and Study) by: Fernando González García, 2008.

References

External links

Makhmalbaf Film House (Official Website of Makhmalbaf's family: Mohsen – Marzieh – Samira – Maysam – Hana)
 
Firouzan Films Iranian Movie Hall of Fame Inductee Mohsen Makhmalbaf
Worlds Transformed: Iranian Cinema and Social Vision
Mohsen Makhmalbaf: Retrospective by Donato Totaro (1997)

Iranian film directors
Iranian essayists
Iranian male novelists
Iranian novelists
Iranian screenwriters
Persian-language film directors
Fellini Gold Medalists
Parajanov Award winners
Iranian democracy activists
People from Tehran
1957 births
Living people
Iranian emigrants to France
Iranian editors
Mojahedin of the Islamic Revolution Organization politicians
Crystal Simorgh for Best Director winners
Crystal Simorgh for Best Screenplay winners